Buffalo Gas Light Company Works is a historic gas works located at Buffalo in Erie County, New York.  After the main gas works structure was razed, the West Genesee Street facade was preserved and later incorporated into the headquarters of HealthNow New York.

It was listed on the National Register of Historic Places in 1976.

References

External links

Buffalo Gas Co., Buffalo as an Architectural Museum website
Buffalo Gas Light Company Works - U.S. National Register of Historic Places on Waymarking.com

Historic American Engineering Record in New York (state)
Buildings and structures in Buffalo, New York
Industrial buildings and structures on the National Register of Historic Places in New York (state)
Industrial buildings completed in 1859
Infrastructure completed in 1859
National Register of Historic Places in Buffalo, New York